The High and Mighty Hawk is an album by saxophonist Coleman Hawkinsthat which was recorded in 1958 and released on the Felsted label.

Reception

Scott Yanow of AllMusic states: "For one of the first times, on the lengthy 'Bird of Prey Blues' that opens this LP, Hawkins showed that at last he had mastered the blues. His honking and roaring improvisation, although more sophisticated than the usual solos by R&B tenors, captured their spirit and extroverted emotions perfectly. It is the highlight of this otherwise excellent (if more conventional) quintet session."

Track listing
 "Bird of Prey Blues" (Coleman Hawkins) – 11:15
 "My One and Only Love" (Guy Wood, Robert Mellin) – 7:24
 "Vignette" (Hank Jones) – 4:31
 "Ooh-Wee, Miss G.P.!" (Hawkins) – 4:00
 "You've Changed" (Bill Carey, Carl T. Fischer) – 7:42
 "Get Set" (Jones) – 5:01

Personnel
Coleman Hawkins – tenor saxophone
Buck Clayton – trumpet
Hank Jones – piano
Ray Brown – bass
Mickey Sheen – drums

References

Coleman Hawkins albums
1958 albums
Felsted Records albums